

 
This is a list of the National Register of Historic Places listings in Sacramento County, California.

This is intended to be a complete list of the properties and districts on the National Register of Historic Places in Sacramento County, California, United States. Latitude and longitude coordinates are provided for many National Register properties and districts; these locations may be seen together in an online map.

There are 108 properties and districts listed on the National Register in the county, including 6 National Historic Landmarks.  Another property was once listed but has been removed.  The table does not include the Big Four House, which was designated a National Historic Landmark in 1961, but is not listed on the National Register.

Current listings

|}

Former listings

|}

See also

List of National Historic Landmarks in California
National Register of Historic Places listings in California
California Historical Landmarks in Sacramento County, California

References

Sacramento